This is a list of notable alumni of DePaul University in Chicago.

Business leaders

Politicians, government officials, and civic leaders

Athletes and sports figures

Authors

Musicians

Film, theater and media personalities

 Tom Amandes
 Gillian Anderson
 Kevin Anderson
 Tom Bosley
 W. Earl Brown
 Janai Brugger
 Julianne Buescher
 P.J. Byrne
 Paula Cale
 Sean Cassidy
 Monique Coleman
 Dana DeLorenzo
 Paul Dinello
 Tsi-Tsi-Ki Félix
 Cole Bennett
 Judy Greer
 Sean Gunn
 Zach Helm
 Linda Hunt
 Simran Judge
 Stana Katic
 Joe Keery
 Alexander Koch
 Harvey Korman
 Sarah Kustok
 Lauren Lapkus
 Cody Lassen
 Karl Malden
 Joe Mantegna
 Jane McNeill
 Reese Mishler
 Michael Muhney
 Tom O'Horgan
 Zak Orth
 Geraldine Page
 Betsy Palmer
 Elizabeth Perkins
 Christian Picciolini
 John C. Reilly
 Leonard Roberts
 Michael Rooker
 Arthur Spivak
 Jaboukie Young-White
 Todd Zuniga
 David Dastmalchian

Science and technology
 Mary Alice McWhinnie, biologist, Antarctic researcher.
Dr. Richard H. Lawler, transplant pioneer
Robert Plomin, American psychologist and geneticist best known for his work in twin studies and behavior genetics.

Other 

Todd Beamer (Class of 1993) — software salesperson & hero on United Airlines Flight 93 during the September 11 attacks
 Shirien Damra – American illustrator, designer, artist, and activist.
Chelsea Tayui – Miss Universe Ghana 2020
 Veruca James - Adult Film Actress

References

External links
 DePaul University Office of Alumni Relations website

DePaul University alumni
De Paul